Manitowoc may refer to:

 Manitowoc, Wisconsin, county seat of Manitowoc County
 Manitowoc County, Wisconsin
 Manitowoc (town), Wisconsin a town mostly annexed by the city of Manitowoc
 Manitowoc River, a river in Wisconsin
 Manitowoc Rapids, Wisconsin a town named after rapids along the Manitowoc River
 The Manitowoc Company, heavy equipment manufacturers

See also 
 Manitou